Velaikaran is a 1952 Indian Tamil-language film directed by P. V. Krishnan and produced by Sri Valli Productions. The film stars T. R. Mahalingam, S. Varalakshmi and Madhuridevi.

Cast
The list is adapted from the book Thiraikalanjiyam.

T. R. Mahalingam
T. S. Balaiah
S. V. Subbaiah
Madhuri Devi
S. Varalakshmi
M. S. Draupathi

Production
This film was a failure.

Soundtrack
The music was composed by R. Sudarsanam. The lyrics were penned by Kavimani Desigavinayagam Pillai, Papanasam Sivan, K. D. Santhanam, Ku. Ma. Balasubramaniam and K. P. Kamatchisundaram. The singers are T. R. Mahalingam and S. Varalakshmi. Playback singers are C. S. Jayaraman, M. S. Rajeswari, T. S. Bhagavathi, Soolamangalam Rajalakshmi and A. G. Rathnamala.

References

External links

1950s Tamil-language films
Films scored by R. Sudarsanam